Birkby is a hamlet in the Allerdale district of the English county of Cumbria, historically within Cumberland, near the Lake District National Park. In 1870-72 it had a population of 157.

Governance
Birkby is in the parliamentary constituency of Workington. In the December 2019 general election, the Tory candidate for Workington, Mark Jenkinson, was elected the MP, overturning a 9.4 per cent Labour majority from the 2017 election to eject shadow environment secretary Sue Hayman by a margin of 4,136 votes. Until the December 2019 general election, the Labour Party had won the seat in every general election since 1979.The Conservative Party had only been elected once in Workington since World War II, at the 1976 by-election. Historically Birkby has been a Labour supporting area.

Before Brexit for the European Parliament its residents voted to elect MEP's for the North West England constituency.

For Local Government purposes it is in the Ellen & Gilcrux Ward of Allerdale Borough Council and the Maryport North Ward of Cumbria County Council.

Birkby is in the parish of Crosscanonby which has its own Parish Council; Crosscanonby Parish Council.

See also

List of places in Cumbria

References

Hamlets in Cumbria
Crosscanonby